In enzymology, an alkylglycerophosphate 2-O-acetyltransferase is an enzyme that catalyzes the chemical reaction

acetyl-CoA + 1-alkyl-sn-glycero-3-phosphate  CoA + 1-alkyl-2-acetyl-sn-glycero-3-phosphate

Thus, the two substrates of this enzyme are acetyl-CoA and 1-alkyl-sn-glycero-3-phosphate, whereas its two products are CoA and 1-alkyl-2-acetyl-sn-glycero-3-phosphate.

This enzyme belongs to the family of transferases, specifically those acyltransferases transferring groups other than aminoacyl groups.  The systematic name of this enzyme class is acetyl-CoA:1-alkyl-sn-glycero-3-phosphate 2-O-acetyltransferase. This enzyme is also called alkyllyso-GP:acetyl-CoA acetyltransferase.  This enzyme participates in ether lipid metabolism.

References

 

EC 2.3.1
Enzymes of unknown structure